Standard dimension ratio (SDR) is a method of rating a pipe's durability against pressure. The standard dimension ratio  describes the correlation between the pipe dimension and the thickness of the pipe wall.

Common nominations are SDR11, SDR17 and SDR35. Pipes with a lower SDR can withstand higher pressures.

 Pipe outside diameter

 Pipe wall thickness

References

Piping